Forua is a town and municipality located in the province of Biscay, Basque Country, Spain.

References

External links
 FORUA in the Bernardo Estornés Lasa - Auñamendi Encyclopedia (Euskomedia Fundazioa) 

 
Municipalities in Biscay